Three referendums were held in Switzerland during 1900. The first was held on 20 May on a federal law on health, accident and military insurance, and was rejected by 69.8% of voters. The second and third were held on 4 November on introducing proportional representation for National Council elections and the direct election and increase in members of the Federal Council. Both were rejected by a majority of voters and cantons.

Background
The referendums on the changes to the National and Federal Councils were popular initiatives, which required a double majority; a majority of the popular vote and majority of the cantons. The decision of each canton was based on the vote in that canton. Full cantons counted as one vote, whilst half cantons counted as half. The insurance referendum was an optional referendum, which required only a majority of the public vote.

Results

Accident, health and military insurance

Introducing proportional representation for National Council elections

Introducing direct elections for an enlarged Federal Council

References

1900 referendums
1900 in Switzerland
Referendums in Switzerland